KRSM-LP (98.9 FM) is an FM radio station broadcasting on a frequency of 98.9 Megahertz.  KRSM-LP has a Public broadcasting format and is licensed to the city of Minneapolis, Minnesota.
The station is based out of the Phillips neighborhood of Minneapolis. The station broadcasts programming in six languages: English, Spanish, Somali, Ojibwe, Hmong, and Haitian Creole.
The station's studios are located in the Waite House Community Center.

References

External links
 
 

Low-power FM radio stations in Minnesota
Radio stations in Minnesota
Radio stations established in 2017
2017 establishments in Minnesota